Yu 1010 was an Imperial Japanese Army transport submarine of the Yu 1001 subclass of the Yu I type. Constructed for use during the latter stages of World War II, she served in the waters of the Japanese archipelago.

Construction
In the final two years of World War II, the Imperial Japanese Army constructed transport submarines — officially the Type 3 submergence transport vehicle and known to the Japanese Army as the Maru Yu — with which to supply its isolated island garrisons in the Pacific. Only submarines of the Yu I type were completed and saw service. None of the Yu I-type submarines carried torpedoes or had torpedo tubes. Yu 1010 a unit of the Yu 1001 subclass.

Japan Steel Works (Nihon Seikojo) constructed  at its plant in Hiroshima, Japan. Records of the details of the construction of Yu 1010 have not been discovered, but the earliest Yu I-type submarines of the original Yu 1 subclass were laid down and launched during the latter half of 1943 and entered service at the end of 1943 or early in 1944.

Service history
Yu 1010 spent her operational career in Japanese home waters. Surviving records of the activities of Imperial Japanese Army submarines are fragmentary, and no records have been discovered describing her specific activities in support of any particular operation.

World War II ended with the cessation of hostilities on 15 August 1945.Yu 1010 surrendered to the Allies later in August 1945. She subsequently either was scuttled or scrapped.

References

Footnotes

Bibliography
 

 
Rekishi Gunzō, History of Pacific War Extra, Perfect guide, The submarines of the Imperial Japanese Forces, Gakken, Tokyo Japan, 2005, .
Rekishi Gunzō, History of Pacific War Vol.45, Truth histories of the Imperial Japanese Naval Vessels, Gakken, Tokyo Japan, 2004, .
Ships of the World No.506, Kaijinsha, Tokyo Japan, 1996.
The Maru Special, Japanese Naval Vessels No.43 Japanese Submarines III, Ushio Shobō, Tokyo Japan, 1980.
Atsumi Nakashima, Army Submarine Fleet, "The secret project !, The men challenged the deep sea", Shinjinbutsu Ōraisha, Tokyo Japan, 2006, .
50 year history of the Japan Steel Works (first volume and second volume), Japan Steel Works, 1968.

1940s ships
Ships built in Japan
Submarines of the Imperial Japanese Army
World War II submarines of Japan